"Mindcircus" is a song by English electronic music duo Way Out West featuring singer Tricia Lee Kelshall. It was released on 17 April 2002 through Distinct'ive Records, as the third single from Way Out West's second studio album Intensify. The song peaked at #39 in the UK Singles Chart in 2002, and reached number 1 in the UK Dance Chart. The popularity of the song was extended by a remix from Gabriel & Dresden, which featured on Tiësto's In Search of Sunrise 3: Panama.

Background
Following "Intensify", "Mindcircus" was released as the third single from Intensify. In 2002, Black Hole released Mindcircus (Remixes) which reached #6 on Billboards US Dance Club Songs chart. A music video for the song was also filmed.

BBC Music's 2002 review of Intensify described the song positively, praising Trisha Lee Kelshall's vocal performance. Christian Hopwood wrote "Trisha Lee Kelshall provides a firm tie to their house moorings as her vocals chisel a melancholy edge to the lush arrangements of "Mindcircus"".

Formats and track listings

ChartsRemixes'

See also
 List of UK Dance Singles Chart number ones of 2002

References

External links
 "Mindcircus" on YouTube

2002 singles
2001 songs
Way Out West (duo) songs